Interferon-induced guanylate-binding protein 1 is a protein that in humans is encoded by the GBP1 gene. It belongs to the dynamin superfamily of large GTPases.

Function 

Guanylate binding protein expression is induced by interferon.  Guanylate binding proteins are characterized by their ability to specifically bind guanine nucleotides (GMP, GDP, and GTP) and are distinguished from the GTP-binding proteins by the presence of 2 binding motifs rather than 3.

References

Further reading